Kuchino is a rural locality (a village) in Staroselskoye Rural Settlement, Vologodsky District, Vologda Oblast, Russia. The population was 12 as of 2002.

Geography 
Kuchino is located 31 km west of Vologda (the district's administrative centre) by road. Sareyka is the nearest rural locality. The former Soviet labor colony, Perm-36, is located very close to the village.

References 

Rural localities in Vologodsky District